Aleksey Shibko (born 27 September 1977) is a Belarusian ski jumper. He competed in the normal hill and large hill events at the 1998 Winter Olympics.

References

1977 births
Living people
Belarusian male ski jumpers
Olympic ski jumpers of Belarus
Ski jumpers at the 1998 Winter Olympics
Place of birth missing (living people)